Chennai International Queer Film Festival (also known as Reel Desires: Chennai International Queer Film Festival) is a three-day LGBT- event that usually takes places on the last weekend of July as a part of the city's pride events. The main organizers are SAATHII and Orinam in partnership with Goethe-Institut, Chennai. The other volunteers include various community groups and NGOs, including Nirangal, East-West Center for Counselling, and RIOV. The last day is usually performances along with a panel discussion, usually to discuss and bring out the challenges faced by community members.

Background
This LGBT-film festival is being held from 2005 in the city. The shorts, documentary and feature film submissted usually explore the intersections among sexuality/gender identity and other forms of marginalization, also including those based on gender, disability, immigrant/refugee status, caste, socio-economic class, religion, age, and race/ethnicity.

2017
The 12th queer film festival in 2017 saw 27 films, which were chosen from nearly 70 submissions from 12 countries. The event also saw a panel discussion about the activism in the south of India, around LGBTQIA, titled `South of the Norm: LGBTIQA+ activism in southern India'.

Movies Screened 
Some of the movies screened include:

2016
It is the fourth time the Goethe-Institut is collaborating with the Reel Desires. Of the 80 films received, the organizers chose 26 films from eight countries. Some notable movies were Sridhar Rangayan’s National Award-winning Breaking Free, Chennai-based Sairam Biswas’s It Adhu But Aanaal and also the acclaimed Aligarh. The panel discussion this year was about "Ending Gender and Sexuality-based Violence".

2015
Reel Desires: Chennai International Queer Film Festival 2015, will be held from 24 to 26 July at the Goethe-Institut / Max Mueller Bhavan in Chennai. The festival will screen 23 films from eight countries, out of which some of the significant ones are Pride, the 2014 Cannes Film Festival award winner, Walking the Walk by Moses Tulasi, Aakkamum Thaakkamum (portrayals of transgender women in Tamil Cinema) and more.

2014
In 2014, the festival also hosted a photography exhibition by Shilpa Raj, a Bengaluru-based photographer, and social activist. Her exhibits were transgender people posing in diverse avatars, charting the transition from male to female in 14 stills. There were also photos that establish references to Ramayana and Mahabharata.
Some of the noteworthy movies screened were Kyunki, an Indian Submission, Eyes that do not see, from USA, Kumu Hina, a Hawaiian movie and Not funny from Germany.

2013
2013 the organizers received around ninety one films from 22 countries, out of which 35 films including shorts, documentaries, and feature films were screened. These were from India and over 10 countries.
The three-day event was from 11 to 13 July 2013 and some movies screened were Gay_Lonely, about a 30-plus gay man, Kuch Palon Mein, Veena Kulkarni’s ‘Reminiscene of Ether’, Debalina Majumder’s ‘Ebang Bewarish (And the Unclaimed)’ among others.

See also
List of LGBT film festivals
Tamil Sexual Minorities

External links 
 Official Website 
 Orinam

References

LGBT film festivals in India
LGBT culture in Chennai
Events in Chennai